The Society for Medical Decision Making (SMDM) is an organization of researchers, clinicians, educators, managers and policy makers based in Bridgewater, New Jersey. It researches and uses rigorous and transparent methodologies in health and clinical care of individuals to assist in health policy formation. Founded in 1979, it holds annual meetings in North America, biennial meetings in Europe and publishes two journals, 'Medical Decision Making', and 'Medical Decision Making P&P.'

References

External links

Medical and health organizations based in the United States